Houston Street Line may refer to::

 Houston Street Line (surface), a bus route in Manhattan, New York City
 Houston–Essex Street Line, a rapid-transit line in Manhattan, New York City